Mount Drysdale is a locality and ghost town in the Orana region of New South Wales, Australia. It was once a village associated with gold mining. The locality is better known today, by its older name Tindarey,  after the original pastoral holding from which the village site was excised.

Location 
The site of the former village lies within the County of Robinson, Parish of Moquilamba. It lay approximately 4 km west of Kidman Way, north of Cobar. The nearest settlement is Cobar, approximately 40 km distant by road.

History

Aboriginal and early settler history 
The area that would become Mount Drysdale lies on the traditional lands of the Wangaaypuwan dialect speakers (also known as Wangaibon) of the Ngiyampaa people, referred to in their own language as  Ngiyampaa Wangaaypuwan. There is significant evidence of Aboriginal occupation at Mount Drysdale and it has been declared as an Aboriginal place. It lies 40 km east-north-east of the Mount Grenfell rock art site, an important Ngiyampaa Wangaaypuwan Aboriginal place.

Settlers took over the area now known as Mount Drysdale, as part of the 'Tindarey' (or 'Tindeyrey') pastoral leasehold that was notified in July 1885. It was, at best, marginal country for sheep grazing, even more so after the spread of feral rabbits to the area.

Settler records show that there were Aboriginal people still living on the  'Tindarey' sheep station in late 1885. It seems that there was frontier violence—probably including a massacre of local people by settlers in the Mount Drysdale area, either during the 1880s or in 1899—the earlier period seems more likely. Whatever it was that occurred is not well documented. However, by 1907, official records showed no Aboriginal people as living at Mount Drysdale.

Mining village 
In 1887, gold had been found at Mount Billagoe. In 1892, payable alluvial gold was found on the western side of a hill at the northern end of the same range of hills. That caused a rush to the field and prospectors soon started to search for a reef. In October 1892, David Drysdale found the gold reef on that hill and it was named, Mount Drysdale, after him. In August 1893, there were 120 men working on the field.

The site for a village—on the eastern side of the base of Mount Drysdale, downhill from the Mount Drysdale claim—was selected in August 1893  and the village of Mount Dysdale was proclaimed on 18 October 1893. In late 1894, there were around 400 miners working on the field and land was reserved for the village's public buildings. By mid-1895, the village had three hotels, a large store, a post office and a school with 90 pupils.

Although there were many claims and mines on the field, two mines would come to dominate the field, the Mount Drysdale mine and the Eldorado mine. These two mines were adjacent and, in time, would come be operated conjointly. The field was a rich one and was prosperous for many years. In 1910, the Mt Drysdale mine had reached a depth of over 500 feet, and had struck water.

By mid 1912, both the Mt Drysdale and Eldorado companies were in financial difficulty. Mining was suspended and, in March 1913, it was resolved to wind up the Mt Drysdale company. In 1916, a syndicate was formed to dewater the Mt Drysdale mine and recommence operations; it seems to have failed, because the mine's equipment was up for sale in mid-1917, and the syndicate was wound up in May 1918. The machinery at the Eldorado mine was up for sale in August 1918. All attempts to reopen the mines appear to have failed.

Mining and exploration continued on a smaller scale, during the 1920s and 1930s but the heyday of the gold field had been over, once the two dominant mines closed. The police station closed in October 1914. The school closed in 1913 and its building was relocated to another mining settlement, Elouera, in 1919.

There was a smaller, neighbouring  village known as Drysdale West—proclaimed in November 1894—but it seems to have not lasted long and its design was cancelled in 1922. There was a market garden, run by ethnic-Chinese, near West Drysdale.

The village could still raise a cricket team in the late 1920s. By 1932, all that was left of the village was a store, a post office, a hall and about four houses "distantly situated". The old school site was resumed in 1946 and the reserves of land for public buildings were revoked in 1951. There were only seven voters there at the 1950 election. In 1962, it ceased to be a polling place. The old village faded away. Its last residents were known as 'Dot and Joe', whose deserted cottage was still standing in 2006.

Cobar Shire advertised for sale 20 allotments in the old village, to recover rates that had not been paid by their long-absent owners, in 2006. At least notionally, the village of Mount Drysdale still exists.

Remnants 
McKell Street still appears on maps—now at the locality of Tindarey—as do many allotments of the former Mount Drysdale village. Other now lost streets of the former village included  Kelly, Cotton, Waddlell, Gould, Macpherson, Cobar and Carter streets. The village has a cemetery. The 'Mine Tank', an in-ground water storage once used by the mines, still exists, as do remnants of the market garden; all lie to the north of the village on the far side of the hill close to the site of West Drysdale. There is a surviving government caretaker's cottage. Otherwise, apart from its worked out mines, rusting equipment and some ruins, there is nothing left of Mount Drysdale.

In February 2022, Mount Drysdale was added to the N.S.W. Heritage Register as the Billagoe (Mount Drysdale) Cultural Landscape, noted for both its Aboriginal and settler heritage significance.

References

External links

 Bonzle Digital Atlas of Australia - photographs relating to Mount Drysdale (mines and village)

Ghost towns in New South Wales
1893 establishments in Australia
Mining towns in New South Wales
Cobar Shire
Cultural landscapes of Australia